Amsacta is a genus of tiger moths in the family Erebidae erected by Francis Walker in 1855. The genus contains several species that need a review.

Species congeneric to the type species 
 Amsacta fuscosa (Bartel, 1903)
 Amsacta latimarginalis Rothschild, 1933
 Amsacta marginalis Walker, 1855

Amsacta sensu lato 
 Amsacta aureolimbata Rothschild, 1910
 Amsacta duberneti Toulgoët, 1968
 Amsacta flavicostata (Gaede, 1916)
 Amsacta grammiphlebia Hampson, 1901
 Amsacta moloneyi Druce, 1887
 Amsacta nigrisignata Gaede, 1923
 Amsacta nivea Hampson, 1916
 Amsacta paolii Berio, 1936

References

Spilosomina
Moth genera